Paper Crown is the second solo album by Nine Black Alps front-man Sam Forrest, released December 28, 2009, on Desert Mine Music.

Prior to release, Forrest had been uploading song previews to his website, where "Say Your Prayers" appeared to be lead single.

Track listing
"Eyes Like A River"
"May Queen"
"Never Seen The Sea"
"Pine Needle Floor"
"Mother Of Corn"
"Say Your Prayers"
"Beverley"
"The Great Migration"
"Not Enough"
"Salvation Army"
"Falling Down Again"
"Streetlight"
"Tender Loving Care"
"Send The Rain"
"Wooden Horse"
"King Of Flesh"
"Wintersong"

Personnel
Sam Forrest – vocals, guitars, bass, banjo, piano, recorder, harmonica, drums, mixing
Hayley Hutchinson – backing vocals
Rebecca Dumican – cello
Stephen Ruggiero – violin
Iain Archer – lap steel
Dave Lynch – mastering

References

2009 albums